Robert Patrick Amell IV (born April 21, 1988) is a Canadian-American actor and producer. He is best-known for his roles as Stephen Jameson on The CW series The Tomorrow People, Ronnie Raymond/Firestorm on The CW series The Flash, Nathan Brown in the current Amazon series Upload, Fred Jones in the films Scooby-Doo! The Mystery Begins and Scooby-Doo! Curse of the Lake Monster, The Hunters as Paxton Flynn, The DUFF as Wesley Rush, The Babysitter as Max, and the science fiction film Code 8 as Connor Reed; the latter of which also starred his cousin Stephen Amell. He also appeared on television shows such as Life with Derek, True Jackson, VP, Unnatural History, and Revenge.

Early life
Amell was born in Toronto; he is the son of Josephine "Jo" Burden and Robert Patrick "Rob" Amell III, who work in the custom jewelry business. His first cousin is Arrow actor Stephen Amell. Along with his sister, he started modeling and acting in small roles in commercials when he was six years old. At age sixteen, he began landing roles in high school plays such as Louis and Dave and Fionia, Picasso at the Lapin Agile and The Importance of Being Earnest. His love for acting made him go to Canadian Studios Acting Academy. He graduated from Lawrence Park Collegiate Institute in Toronto in 2006. He later pursued his career in acting.

Career

Amell's first role was Daniel Murtaugh in Cheaper by the Dozen 2, which was filmed in the Muskoka Region of Ontario. Originally meant to be a non-speaking role, he ended up getting a couple of lines. He also appeared in the 2007 horror film Left for Dead. Amell had a role in the Canadian Family Channel series Life with Derek, playing lead character Casey McDonald's boyfriend Max. Life with Derek was distributed worldwide, including US Disney Channel and its international affiliates. He has also appeared in the ABC Family film Picture This. Amell had a recurring role on both the Nickelodeon series True Jackson, VP as Max Madigan's nephew Jimmy, True's love interest, and the Cartoon Network series Unnatural History.

He played the role of Noel Kahn's brother Eric on the ABC Family television series Pretty Little Liars during the show's third season. Amell has played hockey since he was a child and considered making a career of it until discovering his love of acting. He also takes break dancing lessons. He had a recurring role on MTV's Zach Stone Is Gonna Be Famous. He was cast as Fred Jones in the 2009 TV movie Scooby-Doo! The Mystery Begins, which became the most watched telecast ever on Cartoon Network. He reprised the role in the 2010 sequel Scooby-Doo! Curse of the Lake Monster.

In 2013, Amell received his biggest role to date, lead character Stephen Jameson in CW's sci-fi drama The Tomorrow People, a remake of the British series of the same name. In May 2014, Amell joined The DUFF as Wesley. On July 9, 2014, Amell was cast as a major recurring character on the CW series The Flash as Ronnie Raymond/Firestorm, based on the DC Comics character. He would make appearances over season one as well as two different types of Deathstorm in a season two appearance and later returns for multiple season eight episodes.

In July 2015, Amell was cast in the tenth season of The X-Files as FBI Agent Miller. Amell starred alongside Kevin Spacey and Jennifer Garner in Nine Lives, which was released on August 5, 2016. In 2017, he co-starred in McG's horror film The Babysitter. He reprised his role in the 2020 sequel, The Babysitter: Killer Queen.

Amell starred in and executive produced the sci-fi action film Code 8, with Stephen Amell co-starring and also executive producing. The film, expanding on an earlier short, was funded by an Indiegogo campaign which raised over $2 million.

Personal life
Amell began dating actress Italia Ricci in July 2008. The couple got engaged on August 20, 2014, and married on October 15, 2016. Amell and Ricci had their first child, a son, in 2019; they became dual Canadian/US citizens in January 2020 and reside in Toronto.

Amell was a fan of the Toronto Maple Leafs ice hockey team growing up, though since his move to Los Angeles, Amell has begun cheering for the Los Angeles Kings, but still calls Toronto his "second team". In a 2015 interview, Amell discussed his support for a second NHL team in Toronto via league expansion.

Filmography

Film

Television

Awards and nominations

References

External links

 

1988 births
Living people
21st-century Canadian male actors
Canadian emigrants to the United States
Canadian expatriate male actors in the United States
Film producers from Ontario
Canadian male child actors
Canadian male film actors
Canadian male television actors
Canadian male voice actors
Canadian people of Dutch descent
Canadian people of English descent
Canadian people of French descent
Canadian people of German descent
Canadian people of Irish descent
Canadian people of Scottish descent
Canadian people of Welsh descent
Male actors from Toronto
People with acquired American citizenship
Twitch (service) streamers